
Year 654 (DCLIV) was a common year starting on Wednesday (link will display the full calendar) of the Julian calendar. The denomination 654 for this year has been used since the early medieval period, when the Anno Domini calendar era became the prevalent method in Europe for naming years.

Events 
 By place 

 Byzantine Empire 
 Emperor Constans II appoints his son Constantine IV, age 2, co-emperor (Augustus). He is too young to rule as monarch of the Byzantine Empire, and his title remains a given name.

 Europe 
 King Recceswinth draws up the Liber Judiciorum at Toledo, a Visigothic code based on Roman law, that establishes equality between Goths and Hispano-Romans without regard to racial or cultural differences.

 Britain 
 King Penda of Mercia defeats the East Anglians at Bulcamp near Blythburgh (Suffolk). King Anna of East Anglia and his son Jurmin are killed.
 Æthelhere succeeds his brother Anna as king of East Anglia, and accepts Mercian overlordship (approximate date).

 Arabian Caliphate 
 Muawiyah, governor of Syria, stations a large garrison on Cyprus. He conquers the Greek island of Kos in the Dodecanese.
 Arab invaders cross the Oxus River, in what later will be Uzbekistan. Nomadic Turkic tribes continue to control Central Asia.

 Asia 
 November 24 – Emperor Kōtoku dies after a 9-year reign; Kōgyoku (his elder sister) is restored  on the throne under the name Saimei.
 Takamuko no Kuromaro, a Japanese diplomat, is sent to the Tang Dynasty again, but dies upon his arrival in Chang'an.
 Nakatomi no Kamatari, the inner minister (naidaijin) of Japan, is granted the Shikwan (the Purple Cap).
 Muyeol becomes king of the Korean kingdom of Silla.

 By topic 

 Religion 
 August 10 – The exiled Pope Martin I is deposed, and succeeded by Eugene I, as the 75th pope of the Roman Catholic Church. On September 17, Martin is taken to Constantinople and publicly humiliated, for having condemned the Byzantine Emperor Constans II in 649.
 Philibert, Frankish abbot, receives a gift from King Clovis II of Neustria, and founds Jumièges Abbey in Normandy.

Births 
 Takechi, Japanese prince (approximate date)
 Theuderic III, king of the Franks (d. 691)

Deaths 
 January 16 – Gao Jifu, chancellor of the Tang Dynasty (b. 596)
 June 1 – Pyrrhus, patriarch of Constantinople
 November 24 – Kōtoku, emperor of Japan (b. 596)
 Anna, king of East Anglia (approximate date)
 Conall Cóel, high king of Ireland
 Dúnchad mac Conaing, king of Dál Riata (modern Scotland)
 Jindeok of Silla, queen of Silla
 Jurmin, Anglo-Saxon prince (approximate date)
 Takamuko no Kuromaro, Japanese diplomat

References